The 1999 Superbike World Championship was the twelfth FIM Superbike World Championship season. The season started on 28 March at Kyalami and finished on 10 October at Sugo after 13 rounds.

Carl Fogarty won the riders' championship, his fourth and final, and Ducati won the manufacturers' championship.

Race calendar and results

Championship standings

Riders' standings

Manufacturers' standings

External links

References

Superbike World Championship seasons